The Idiot Cycle is a 2009 French-Canadian documentary which alleges that six major chemical companies are responsible for decades of cancer causing chemicals and pollution, and also develop cancer treatments and drugs.  It also argues these companies own the most patents on genetically modified crops that have never been tested for long term health impacts like cancer.

Production
The film was shot in Canada (Sarnia, Ottawa, Toronto, ON and Saskatoon, SK), the United States (Memphis, TN, Midland, MI, and Washington DC), The Netherlands (Amsterdam), France (Agen, Paris), Italy (Bologna), Germany (Weilheim, Frankfurt, Bad Neihum, Burladingen, Tübingen), Belgium (Brussels), England (London, Hemel Hempstead), and Northern Ireland (Coleraine).

Film festivals

Awards
"Green Report" Award - Romanian Film Festival Document.Art.

Appearances
RIDM (Montreal)
IDFA (Amsterdam)
OXDOX (Oxford)
International Health Film Festival (Greece)

References

External links
 Website archive
 Interview about The Idiot Cycle
 

2009 films
2009 in the environment
2000s French-language films
French documentary films
2009 documentary films
Documentary films about environmental issues
Documentary films about cancer
2000s English-language films
2000s French films